Jedan dan života is a collaborative maxi single by Yugoslav singers Lepa Brena and Miroslav Ilić. It was released 27 May 1985 through the record label PGP-RTB. Both "Jedan dan života" and "Živela Jugoslavija" topped the national music charts.

On 19 November 2010, Serbian tabloid SvetPlus chose "Jedan dan života" as the "Hit Song of the Day".

Background 
For the cooperation of Lepa Brena and Miroslav Ilić, the most important is Brena's manager Raka Đokić, who at that time became manager and Miroslav Ilić. All songs from the album became big hits. In the summer of 1985, Brena and Miroslav started together on a stadium tour in Yugoslavia, in order to promote their album.
The album was sold in 800,000 copies.

Track listing

Personnel

Production and recording
Mića Đordević – supervisor
Dragan Vukićević –  engineering
Stanko Terzić – editing

Crew
Ivan Ćulum – design
Ivan Mojašević – photography

Release history

References

1985 albums
Lepa Brena albums
PGP-RTB albums
Serbo-Croatian language albums